The Slanské Hills (in Slovak, Slanské vrchy) is a range of mountains in eastern Slovakia, one segment of the Mátra-Slanec Area of the Inner Western Carpathians.

Details 
The area is named after the nearest town in the southern portion, Slanec.

The mountains are forested, with several mineral springs, and resources such as gold, silver, and antimony. Passes through the mountains include the Herľany Pass and Dargov Pass (Dargovský priesmyk), site of a significant World War II battle.

Geology and formation 
The Slanské Hills are a chain of andesite volcanoes formed simultaneously with marine deposition during the Neogene geological age (20-11 MYA). Volcanoes in the chain include Makovica and Strechový Vrch.

References

Mountain ranges of Slovakia
Mountain ranges of the Western Carpathians